Marmara may refer to:

Places 
 Marmara, Greece, mountainous area on Crete
 Neos Marmaras, a village in Greece
 Marmara Town, a town in Nigeria
 Marmara (Lycia), a town of ancient Lycia, now in Turkey
 Marmara Region, comprising 11 provinces of Turkey
 Sea of Marmara, an inland sea in Marmara Region, Turkey
 Marmara Island, an island in Balıkesir Province, Marmara
 Marmara District, a district in Balıkesir Province, Marmara
 Lake Marmara, a lake in Manisa Province
 Marmara Ereğlisi, a town in Tekirdağ Province, Turkey

 Marmara Sea, the body of water to the south of Istanbul

Other uses
 Marmara (beer) 
 Marmara (moth), a genus of moths
 Marmara (newspaper), a newspaper in Armenian language
 Marmara University
 Tour of Marmara, an international cycling tour in Marmara Region

People with the surname
 Nilgün Marmara (1958–1987), Turkish poet
 Pembe Marmara (1925–1984), Turkish Cypriot poet

See also
 Gölmarmara, a town and district in Manisa Province, in the Aegean Region of Turkey 
 Marmora (disambiguation)
 MV Mavi Marmara
 RV TÜBİTAK Marmara, a research vessel